Bob Thunder: Internet Assassin is an action comedy film directed by Joe Nation and starring Shane Dawson, Chester See, and Olga Kay. It is produced by Relativity Digital Studios, FilmOn, and Epic Level Entertainment. The film was released on October 27, 2015, through video on demand.

Premise
Joe Nation wants to go viral on YouTube and reach Internet fame. But things take a turn for the worse when he mistakenly hires Bob Thunder, a cold-blooded killer, to help him.

Cast
Joe Nation as himself/Bob Thunder
Alki David as Mr. Network
Jack Douglass as Pippen
Adande Thorne as himself
Olga Kay as herself
Chester See as himself
Shane Dawson as himself
Toby Turner as himself
Janice Dickinson as herself
Joey Graceffa as himself
PrankvsPrank as themselves
Lisa Schwartz as herself
Bree Essrig as herself
Jess Lizama as herself
Adi Shankar as the scientist
Tay Zonday as himself
Meghan Camarena as herself
Hank Chen as himself
Iman Crosson as himself
Irina Voronina as Bikini Girl
Shanna Malcolm as herself
Brennan Murray as Jehovah's Witness #2

Release
The film was released on October 27, 2015 through video on demand by Relativity Digital Studios.

References

External links
 

2015 films
American action comedy films
YouTube
2015 action comedy films
2010s English-language films
2010s American films